De Nieuwe Mens, formerly known as the Party for Human and Spirit (MenS), is a political party in the Netherlands. The party registered with the electoral council in December 2008.

History 

The Party for Human and Spirit (MenS) was founded on 11 March 2008 by astrologer Lea Manders. Since 2010, it has taken part in several elections, but it never managed to win any seats.

In the 2017 general election, MenS participated in a combined list with the Basic Income Party (BIP) and the movement Peace and Justice (V&R), with Tara-Joëlle Fonk as lijsttrekker.

Name change 
In September 2020, the name of the party was changed to De Nieuwe Mens. The party had intended to take part in the 2021 general election, but ultimately did not submit the required documents to the Electoral Council.

Election results

General elections

Provincial elections

Municipal elections

See also 
 Die Violetten

References

External links 
 Official website

Political parties in the Netherlands
Political parties established in 2008
2008 establishments in the Netherlands
Western spiritually leaning parties